Central Lakes College is a public community college with campuses in Brainerd and Staples, Minnesota. It is part of the Minnesota State Colleges and Universities System. The college was formed from the merger of three different colleges: Brainerd Community College (Brainerd Junior College), Brainerd Technical College (Brainerd Technical Institute), and Staples Technical College (Staples Technical Institute).

Campuses

Central Lakes
Central Lakes College in Brainerd includes courses in the liberal arts and sciences with an Associate in Arts degree and Minnesota Transfer Curriculum for transfers to a four-year college. It also offers Associate in Science degrees, and technical programs that have Associate in Applied Science degrees, diplomas and certificates to get students in the work world in a short amount of time. The college also included many unique degrees such as Underwater Diving  along with an assortment of "green" environmental and ecological courses.

In athletics, Central Lakes College is home of the Raiders. There is NJCAA Volleyball, Football, Basketball, Baseball, Softball, and Golf.

Staples
Staples community college is mostly technical programs with Associate in Applied Science (AAS) degrees, diplomas and certifications including robotics, heavy equipment operation, photographic technology, and automotive technology as well as a smaller liberal arts program Associate in Arts (AA).

Academics
The college offers the Associate in Arts, Associate in Science, and Associate in Applied Science degrees. It also offers diploma and certificate programs. It is also accredited for its concurrent enrollment programs by the National Alliance of Concurrent Enrollment Partnerships (NACEP).

Central Lakes College in Brainerd collaborated with Southwest Minnesota State University to establish a 2 + 2 articulation agreement in Theatre Arts.

References

External links
 Official website

Community colleges in Minnesota
Education in Crow Wing County, Minnesota
Education in Todd County, Minnesota
Education in Wadena County, Minnesota
Two-year colleges in the United States
NJCAA athletics